In 1999, The Blood-Horse magazine assembled a seven-person panel of distinguished horse racing people: Keeneland racing secretary Howard Battle, Maryland Jockey Club vice president Lenny Hale, Daily Racing Form columnist Jay Hovdey, Sports Illustrated senior writer William Nack, California senior steward Pete Pedersen, Louisville Courier-Journal racing writer Jennie Rees and Gulfstream Park steward Tommy Trotter. Each of the experts compiled a list of what they considered to be the top 100 Thoroughbred racehorses of the 20th century, which was then combined into a master list. The list was expanded into a book with complete biographies.

All the horses on the list raced in the United States, though several such as Phar Lap, Northern Dancer, Dahlia and Miesque began their careers in another country. Ruffian was the top-ranked filly.

The small body of voters meant that any individual ballot had the potential to disproportionately influence the final tally, which ended up coming to pass.  At the time of the list's unveiling, Blood-Horse managing editor Evan Hammonds spoke to the Associated Press.  Hammonds revealed that Secretariat and Man o' War had both received three of the seven first-place votes.  (Citation received the other first-place vote.)  Man o' War was listed in first, second or third place on all seven ballots; six of the voters gave the same placement to Secretariat.  However, Hammonds noted, a single voter left Secretariat out of that person's top 10 "because he got beat a few times". The result was that Secretariat became second, rather than first, in the aggregated final list.

Blood-Horse promotes its top two selections as a ranking that "will generate debate for years to come".  After the results became available, panel-member William Nack criticized the voting process as "skewered" because one of the seven voters had ranked Secretariat 14th, thus costing him the top slot. "That's an outrage," Nack told the New York Daily News. "You mean this one person thought Secretariat would finish last in a 14-horse race?"

The electoral friction was reflected in the introduction to the Top 100 Racehorses book produced by Blood-Horse, which conceded, "For all the work and dreaming that went into it... one approaches the list... with a nagging sense of its folly as a rational exercise and of the maddening arbitrariness of its outcome."

A total of 192 horses received at least one vote for inclusion in the list.

Also in 1999, the Associated Press asked a panel of six voters a similar question; four chose Man o' War as best, one named Secretariat, and the sixth picked Tom Fool, which finished 11th on the Blood-Horse list. Additionally in 1992, Sports Illustrated conducted a poll of a panel of seven experts: (Joe Hirsch, executive columnist, Daily Racing Form; Woody Stephens, thoroughbred trainer for more than 50 years; Jim McKay, broadcaster, ABC Sports; Jim Bolus, secretary-treasurer, National Turf Writers Association; Frank E. Kilroe, retired California racing official; Tommy Trotter, Arlington International Racecourse steward; and William F. Reed, turf writer for 28 years) with Man o' War also voted No. 1 greatest horse (with Secretariat No. 2) in racing history.

See also
 List of historical horses

References

Further reading

Horse racing
Horse racing in the United States